The green-backed tit (Parus monticolus) is a species of bird in the family Paridae.

It is found in Bangladesh, Bhutan, China, India, Laos, Myanmar, Nepal, Pakistan, Taiwan and Vietnam.

Its natural habitats are boreal forest, temperate forest, and subtropical or tropical moist lowland forest.

References

External links

green-backed tit
Birds of Central China
Birds of the Himalayas
Birds of Eastern Himalaya
Birds of Laos
Birds of Vietnam
Birds of Taiwan
green-backed tit
Taxonomy articles created by Polbot